"Rollercoaster" is a song recorded by Irish pop girl group B*Witched for their debut album, B*Witched (1998). It was written by B*Witched along with Ray "Madman" Hedges, Martin Brannigan, and Tracy Ackerman. Production helmed by Hedges while addition production was provided by Cutfather & Joe.

On 21 September 1998, the group released "Rollercoaster" as their second single from the album, following "C'est la Vie" four months earlier. With first-week sales of 157,000, the track debuted at number one on the UK Singles Chart in October 1998 and stayed there for another week. It also reached number one in Australia and New Zealand in November 1998.

Track listings

Credits and personnel
Credits are lifted from the B*Witched album booklet.

Studios
 Produced in Ray "Madman" Hedges' Mothership
 Mix engineered at Medley Studio (Copenhagen, Denmark)

Personnel

 B*Witched – writing
 Ray "Madman" Hedges – writing, production, arrangement
 Martin Brannigan – writing, arrangement
 Tracy Ackerman – writing
 Erwin Keiles – guitar
 Daniel Collier – fiddle
 Cutfather & Joe – additional production and remix
 Mads Nilsson – mix engineering

Charts

Weekly charts

Year-end charts

Certifications

References

1998 singles
1998 songs
B*Witched songs
Epic Records singles
Number-one singles in Australia
Number-one singles in New Zealand
Number-one singles in Scotland
Song recordings produced by Ray Hedges
Songs written by Edele Lynch
Songs written by Martin Brannigan
Songs written by Ray Hedges
Songs written by Tracy Ackerman
UK Singles Chart number-one singles